Suzanna (Suzzana) Owíyo is a Kenyan singer.

Early life
Owíyo was born in Kasaye village, Nyakach, near the lakeside city of Kisumu. Suzanna Owíyo was introduced to music at a young age by her grandfather who was a prolific Nyatiti player.

In high school, she helped her school win many trophies during the provincial and national music festivals. After high school in 1998, she joined a Nairobi based singer Sally Oyugi as a backup vocalist. Two years later she parted ways with Oyugi to team up with a local band in Nairobi called Bora Bora sound, and later went back to sing in Kisumu. It was here that a young business entrepreneur discovered her and offered her her first guitar. She then went back to Nairobi and undertook music lessons at the Kenya Conservatoire of Music while continuing to sing at a club in Karen.

Career
It was while preparations were being made for the centennial celebrations of the city of Kisumu, that Owíyo was requested to compose a theme song for the opening ceremony.

She then decided to work on an album with Kenyan music producer Tedd Josiah. The album won her a nomination in the Kora Awards 2002 in the “Most Promising Female Artist category”. The same album won her a Kisima Awards for the Most Promising Female Artist of 2003. Her new single “Sandore” and the video, which commented on child labour, was also a success.

Numerous concerts in Kenya and abroad followed thereafter. In June 2003, she represented her country at the Kenyan Festival in Paris organized by Alliance Française, in August the same year she represented East Africa at the Pan-African music Festival in Brazzaville where she sang alongside Youssou N’dour, Koffi Olomide and Rebecca Malope among other African greats and in December she performed in Djibouti.

In July 2004, she performed at the Festival Mundial in Tilburg, the Netherlands. In December 2004, Suzanna Owíyo beat a host of African artistes to clinch the single berth reserved for a female African artiste to perform at the Nobel Peace Prize Concert, where she performed with her band, and also performed the song "Imagine" with artistes such as Cyndi Lauper, Andrea Bocelli, Chris Botti, Patti LaBelle and Baba Maal. She just finished a tour of France, United States, and Japan.

Suzanna’s music is a fusion of traditional western Kenyan music and contemporary rhythms. Traditional instruments (nyatiti, orutu, etc.) feature in her songs, as heard on “Janyau”, the first track of her new album Yamo Kudho (the wind is blowing). In 2005, Suzanna was the show stopper at the annual Corporate Council on Africa Summit in Baltimore, Maryland where she charmed with her voice. She also performed at the World Trade Expo in Japan, the Zanzibar International Film Festival in Zanzibar. Later in December of the same year, she was invited to the Jamhuri Day fete in Washington DC where she performed and made a series of appearances in Maryland and New York.

In 2006, she traveled to the United States to visit the University of Florida to help start an Arts in Medicine program at Mater Hospital in Nairobi.

Owíyo was part of the Divas of The Nile supergroup, that featured four Kenyan female musicians. The others were Mercy Myra, Achieng Abura and Princess Jully. The group performed at the Festival Mundial in 2007.

2007 was promising. Just when the year began, she was amongst the artist who entertained the delegates (local and international) who attended the World Social Forum held in Nairobi. Locally, she has been involved in the corporate, NGO and Government Sponsored events-i.e. She recorded and performed the Anti-corruption campaign spearheaded by the Kenya Anti-corruption Campaign steering committee. Suzanna also recorded a theme song for the Kenya Tourist Board. In the month of June, she represented Kenya at the MASA Festival that was held in Abidjan, Ivory Coast. In August, Suzanna performed at the prestigious Event called YARA PRIZE AWARDS held in Oslo. Other artists who graced the occasion were Papa Wemba from DRC Congo, the Brass Brothers from Oslo and others. Lastly in December, Suzanna performed at the New Year's Eve Concert held in Maputo, Mozambique. She is currently working on her 3rd album which should be out in the mid of the year. She has featured Oliver Mtukudzi from Zimbabwe, Mbilia Bel from DR Congo in the album. She was nominated for the Best Kenyan Female Artiste category at the 2007 Pearl of Africa Music Awards.

In 2008, she performed at the Nelson Mandela's 90th birthday concert in London and performed again at the WOMEX festival.

Her third album Roots was released on May 18, 2011. In 2011 she was awarded  the prestigious Order of the Grand Warrior of Kenya  from the President of the Republic of Kenya in recognition for her global achievements and efforts through music.

References

External links 
 

Living people
21st-century Kenyan women singers
Kenyan guitarists
Kisima Music Award winners
1975 births
21st-century guitarists
21st-century women guitarists